John Cornwallis (23 December 1706 – 1768) was a British politician who sat in the House of Commons from 1727 to 1747.

History 
Cornwallis was the fourth son of Charles Cornwallis, 4th Baron Cornwallis and his wife Lady Charlotte Butler, daughter of Richard Butler, 1st Earl of Arran. He was educated at Eton College in 1718. He married Sarah Dale, daughter of Rev. Hugh Dale. His brothers Hon. Edward, James and Stephen Cornwallis were also Members of Parliament.

Cornwallis was returned unopposed as Member of Parliament for the family seat of  Eye at the  1727 British general election with his elder brother Stephen. He voted    regularly with the Government and was appointed Equerry to Prince of Wales in about 1731. He spoke against the repeal of the Septennial Act in 1734. At the 1734 British general election he was returned unopposed with his brother again. In 1737, he gave up his post of equerry to the Prince when the Prince of Wales went into opposition, because the pension he had from the King was worth more than the salary from his place. He was returned unopposed with his brother again at the 1741 British general election. At the end of Walpole's Administration he voted with the Opposition on Pulteney's motion for a secret committee to inquire into the war, on account of which his brother, Lord Cornwallis,  turned him out of doors next day.  He subsequently became a follower of the Prince of Wales again. He was not renominated by Lord Cornwallis for Eye at the 1747 British general election but stood on his own account and was defeated.  He did not stand for Parliament again.

Death 
Cornwallis died on 9 June 1768, leaving a son and three daughters.

References

1706 births
1768 deaths
People educated at Eton College
Members of the Parliament of Great Britain for English constituencies
British MPs 1727–1734
British MPs 1734–1741
British MPs 1741–1747